This is the discography of Canadian musician, singer, songwriter and pianist, Sarah McLachlan. Her debut album, Touch was released in 1988 and included first singles: "Vox", "Steaming" and "Ben's Song". The album charted in Canada and the United States and was certified platinum in Canada and gold in the US. 
The next album, Solace was issued in 1991. It peaked at number 20 in Canada and was certified double platinum there. Solace also charted in the US, where it was certified gold. It featured three singles: "The Path of Thorns (Terms)", "Into the Fire" and "Drawn to the Rhythm". The third studio album, Fumbling Towards Ecstasy (1993) became McLachlan's mainstream breakthrough album in Canada and the United States. It peaked at number five in Canada and number 50 on the US Billboard 200, and was certified 5× platinum in Canada and 3× platinum in the US. "Possession" and "Good Enough" became McLachlan's first singles to chart on the US Billboard Hot 100. "Good Enough" also became her first top 10 hit in Canada, reaching number nine. At the 37th Annual Grammy Awards, Fumbling Towards Ecstasy was nominated for the Grammy Award for Best Alternative Music Performance.

In 1997, McLachlan released her most successful album to date, Surfacing. It topped the chart in Canada and reached number two in the United States, and also charted in various countries around the world. Surfacing was certified diamond in Canada for selling over one million copies, 8× platinum in the US for selling eight million copies, and gold in other countries. Surfacing featured the hit singles: "Building a Mystery", "Sweet Surrender", "Adia" and "Angel". All singles charted inside top 10 in Canada, including number one for "Building a Mystery". All singles charted on the Billboard Hot 100, and two of them became McLachlan's first top 10 hits on that chart: "Adia" at number three and "Angel" at number four. At the 40th Annual Grammy Awards, "Building a Mystery" won a Grammy Award for Best Female Pop Vocal Performance and "Last Dance" from Surfacing won a Grammy Award for Best Pop Instrumental Performance. Surfacing was also nominated for the Grammy Award for Best Pop Album. At the 41st Annual Grammy Awards, "Adia" was nominated for Best Female Pop Vocal Performance.

McLachlan's 1999 live album, Mirrorball was also very successful. It topped the chart in Canada and reached number three in the US. It was certified 5× platinum in Canada and 3× platinum in the US. McLachlan's 1995 song, "I Will Remember You" now in live version was released as the lead single from Mirrorball. In 1995, the song already reached number 10 in Canada and number 65 on the Billboard Hot 100. This new live version reached number 10 in Canada again but achieved a new peak on the Billboard Hot 100 at number 14, solely on airplay. At the 42nd Annual Grammy Awards, "I Will Remember You" (Live) won a Grammy Award for Best Female Pop Vocal Performance, Mirrorball was nominated for Best Pop Album and "Possession" (Live) was nominated for the Grammy Award for Best Female Rock Vocal Performance. "Silence" by Delerium featuring McLachlan became one of the greatest trance songs of all time. The original version, released as a single in 1999, was remixed many times over the years to a great success on the charts. "Silence" topped the US Dance Club Songs and reached number one in Ireland. It also peaked at number two in Belgium, number three in the United Kingdom, number five in Canada, number six in Australia, number seven in the Netherlands, and charted in many other countries.

In 2003, McLachlan returned to public life with her fifth studio album, Afterglow. It topped the chart in Canada, reached number two in the US and charted in many countries around the world. Afterglow was certified 5× platinum in Canada, 2× platinum in the US, and gold in other countries. At the 46th Annual Grammy Awards, "Fallen" from Afterglow was nominated for the Grammy Award for Best Female Pop Vocal Performance, and at the 47th Annual Grammy Awards, Afterglow was nominated for the Best Pop Vocal Album. At the 48th Annual Grammy Awards, Afterglow'''s "World on Fire" music video received the Grammy Award for Best Short Form Music Video. In 2006, McLachlan released her first Christmas album, Wintersong. It peaked at number one in Canada and number seven in the US, and was certified 3× platinum in Canada and platinum in the US. At the 49th Annual Grammy Awards, Wintersong was nominated for the Grammy Award for Best Traditional Pop Vocal Album.

In 2008, McLachlan issued her first greatest hits album, Closer: The Best of Sarah McLachlan, which reached number three in Canada and was certified platinum there. It was followed by 2010's Laws of Illusion, 2014's Shine On and 2016's Wonderland. Over the years, McLachlan also released compilations with rare songs like Rarities, B-Sides and Other Stuff (1996) and Rarities, B-Sides and Other Stuff Volume 2 (2008), and albums with remixes: Remixed (2001) and Bloom: Remix Album (2005). In 1994, she also released The Freedom Sessions with alternative versions of her songs from Fumbling Towards Ecstasy. As of 2015, McLachlan has sold over 40 million albums worldwide.

Albums

Studio albums

Live albums

Compilation albums

Remix albums

EPs

Singles
As main artist

As featured artist

Collaborations

Other contributions
 1992: Island of Circles (Donovan tribute album) - "Wear Your Love Like Heaven"
 1993: Live X - One Life - "Good Enough"
 1996: Due South: The Original Television Soundtrack - "Possession" - (piano version)
 1996: A Testimonial Dinner - "Dear God"
 1998: MTV Fantastic Females - '"Adia"
 1999: MTV Fantastic Females 2 - "I Will Remember You (Live)"
 1999: Toy Story 2 - "When She Loved Me" (nominated for Best Original Song, 1999 Academy Awards)
 2002: Being Out Rocks - "Angel"
 2006: Charlotte's Web Soundtrack - "Ordinary Miracle"
 2007: Stockings By the Fire - "I Heard the Bells on Christmas Day"
 2008: Northern Songs: Canada's Best and Brightest - "Angel"
 2013: King Kong (2013 musical) - "What's It Gonna Take"

Video releases
 1994: Fumbling Towards Ecstasy: Live VHS 1995: Sarah McLachlan Video Compilation: 1989-1994 1998: Sarah McLachlan Video Compilation 1989-1998: DVD 1999: Mirrorball DVD/VHS 2004: Fallen/Stupid DVD 2004: Afterglow Live DVD 2004: VH1 Storytellers DVD
 2005: Fumbling Towards Ecstasy Live DVD 2005: Sarah McLachlan: A Life of Music DVD''

Notes

References

Discographies of Canadian artists
Pop music discographies
Discography